Yekaterina Ilyinychna Podkopayeva (born 11 June 1952 in Moscow) is a retired middle distance runner who represented the USSR and later Russia. She gained international recognition in 1983, when she won two bronze medals at the World Championships (in 800 and 1500 metres). The same year she managed an 800 m time of 1:55.96. She resurfaced in 1992, winning the European Indoor Championships and placing 8th in the Olympics. More victories in European and World Indoor Championships followed until she retired after the 1998 season. When she won the 1500 metres at the 1997 World Indoors, she was 44, the oldest World Indoor champion ever.

International competitions

Personal bests
800 metres - 1:55.96 (1983)
1000 metres - 2:37.27 (1993)
1500 metres - 3:56.65 (1984)
Mile run - 4:23.78 (1993)

See also
List of World Athletics Championships medalists (women)
List of IAAF World Indoor Championships medalists (women)
List of European Athletics Championships medalists (women)
List of European Athletics Indoor Championships medalists (women)
List of masters athletes
800 metres at the World Championships in Athletics
1500 metres at the World Championships in Athletics

References

Masters Athletics
Masterstrack

1952 births
Living people
Athletes from Moscow
Soviet female middle-distance runners
Russian female middle-distance runners
Russian masters athletes
Olympic female middle-distance runners
Olympic athletes of the Unified Team
Athletes (track and field) at the 1992 Summer Olympics
Goodwill Games medalists in athletics
Competitors at the 1990 Goodwill Games
Competitors at the 1994 Goodwill Games
World Athletics Championships athletes for the Soviet Union
World Athletics Championships medalists
World Athletics Indoor Championships winners
IAAF Continental Cup winners
European Athletics Championships winners
European Athletics Championships medalists
European Athletics Indoor Championships winners
Russian Athletics Championships winners
World record holders in masters athletics
Friendship Games medalists in athletics